The Goderich Flyers are members of the Provincial Junior Hockey League (PJHL) and are  based in Goderich, Ontario, Canada.

History
After the failed and short-lived Lakeshore Pirates folded in 1999, the town of Goderich pushed for a new team.  They were granted expansion in 2003 after the folding of the Wiarton Wolves. The team was named the Sailors after another Junior C team that had folded in 1993.
The Sailors were granted a leave of absence for the 2013-14 season to try and re-organize.  On April 17, 2014, the Ontario Hockey Association (OHA) advised the organizing committee under the direction of Doug Cruickshank that they were accepted back into the Western Ontario Junior C Hockey League for the 2014-15 season.  In preparation for the new season the team announced a GM a new head coach, and a new name Goderich Flyers Jr. C Hockey Club.

In 2004-05, the Sailors squeezed into the fourth and final playoff spot.  With an automatic berth to the Western league semi-final, the Sailors met up with the Wingham Ironmen.  The Ironmen swept the Sailors 4-games-to-none.

The 2005-06 season ended with the Goderich Sailors in fourth place.  In the playoff quarter-final, the Sailors drew the fifth seeded Walkerton Hawks for a best-of-3 series.  The Hawks made quick work of the Sailors and won the series 2-games-to-none.

The 2006-07 season saw the Goderich Sailors end the years in last place, the sixth seed.  In the Western league quarter-final they again drew the Walkerton Hawks, but this year in the best-of-5 series.  The Hawks, who were coming off of a rather strong regular season, defeated the Sailors 3-games-to-1.

During the summer of 2016 the eight junior "C" leagues in Southern Ontario came together as the Provincial Junior Hockey League.  The former leagues became divisions and assigned to one of four conferences. For the Flyers it means they will compete in the Western Conference and the Pollock Division.

Season-by-season standings

1985-1993
2003-2004
2004–Present

References

External links
Flyers Webpage

Ice hockey teams in Ontario
Goderich, Ontario
Ice hockey clubs established in 2003
2003 establishments in Ontario